Julio Enrique Martínez Rivera (born 8 July 1985) is a retired Salvadoran footballer who last played for Águila and  internationally for the El Salvador national team.

Club career

León
On 15 June 2009, Martínez was one of three Salvadoran footballers signed to the Mexican club Club León on a loan deal from Alianza; the other two were Rodolfo Zelaya and Cristian Castillo.

On 3 December 2009, it was announced that Club León had permanently signed Martínez along with the other two Salvadorans to a three-year contract. However, shortly afterwards, it was announced that Martínez along with the other two Salvadorans would no longer be part of the team for the moment. It was explained that the three foreign player spots allowed for the club had already been taken by other new signings.

Chicago Fire
On 21 January 2010, new Chicago Fire and former El Salvador coach Carlos de los Cobos signed Martínez to Chicago Fire on loan from León. On 30 June 2010, Martínez was released by the Chicago Fire.

Return to Alianza
Prior to returning to Alianza for the Apertura 2010, Martínez had signed with the club in 2009. However, he never managed to make his debut with the squad after he was sent to the Mexican Club León on a loan basis shortly following the announcement of his signing. After the season ended, Club León decided to permanently sign Martínez along with Cristian Castillo and Rodolfo Zelaya, who were also on loan with the Mexican club at the time. For the Apertura 2010, Martínez reunited with two of his former teammates (Castillo) and (Zelaya) who have all previously played at Alianza.

International career
Martínez is a member of the El Salvador national team, having made his debut in an October 2006 friendly match against Panama. He was part of the El Salvador squads which took part in the 2007 and 2009 CONCACAF Gold Cups, and, as of July 2011, he has earned 13 caps and scored two international goals, both in qualifying for the 2010 FIFA World Cup, and both against Mexico.

International goals

Honours

Isidro Metapán
Primera División:
Winner (3): Clausura 2007, Apertura 2008, Clausura 2009

References

External links

El Grafico Profile 

1985 births
Living people
People from Santa Ana Department
Association football wingers
Salvadoran footballers
El Salvador international footballers
2007 CONCACAF Gold Cup players
2009 CONCACAF Gold Cup players
A.D. Isidro Metapán footballers
Alianza F.C. footballers
Club León footballers
Chicago Fire FC players
Salvadoran expatriate footballers
Expatriate footballers in Mexico
Expatriate soccer players in the United States
Major League Soccer players